Brian Weske (23 December 1932 – 15 October 2001) was a British film and television actor. He was born in Stockwell, London, England and died in London, England aged 68.
He married Italian actress and Italian translator speech artist for BBC Records, (1969-'72), Yole Marinelli, (who played in Drop Dead Darling, in 1966), at Wandsworth Registry Office, on the 8th. of October, 1964, according to Shutterstock. Jess Conrad was the Best Man.

Selected filmography
 Medal for the General (1944)
 Quiet Weekend (1946)
 Fame Is the Spur (1947)
 Just William's Luck (1947)
 William Comes to Town (1948)
 Pen Pictures from Rhodesia: Letter One (as Narrator)
 Brandy for the Parson (1952)
 No Safety Ahead (1959)
 Jungle Street (1960)
 Jazz Boat (1960)
 On the Fiddle (1961)
 Panic (1963)
 The Big Switch (1968)
 A Hole Lot of Trouble (1969) 
 Jack the Ripper Part 1	(Porter) 1988

References

External links

1932 births
2001 deaths
People from Stockwell
English male film actors
English male television actors